The 2021 Buschy McBusch Race 400 was a NASCAR Cup Series race was held on May 2, 2021, at Kansas Speedway in Kansas City, Kansas. Contested over 267 laps, on the 1.5 mile (2.4 km) asphalt speedway, it was the 11th race of the 2021 NASCAR Cup Series season.

Report

Background

Kansas Speedway is a  tri-oval race track in Kansas City, Kansas. It was built in 2001 and hosts two annual NASCAR race weekends. The NTT IndyCar Series also raced there until 2011. The speedway is owned and operated by the International Speedway Corporation.

Entry list
 (R) denotes rookie driver.
 (i) denotes driver who are ineligible for series driver points.

Qualifying
Brad Keselowski was awarded the pole for the race as determined by competition-based formula.

Starting Lineup

Race

Brad Keselowski was awarded the pole. Kyle Busch won the first stage while Kyle Larson won the second stage. Larson dominated the race, but was passed for the lead by Denny Hamlin. Hamlin got into the wall while battling Larson and then got into the wall again after a flat tire. On the restart, Ricky Stenhouse Jr. spun after contact with Austin Cindric. On the following restart, Christopher Bell spun and collected Stenhouse and Ryan Preece. In a two lap shootout, Larson got into Ryan Blaney and both fell back as Kyle Busch held off Kevin Harvick to win on his 36th birthday.[199] NASCAR officials were criticized for their handling of an uncontrolled tire by Tyler Reddick's pit crew. They waited several laps until all the cars had pitted, then belatedly threw a caution, despite the tire presenting little apparent danger. This action disadvantaged several of the drivers.

Stage Results

Stage One
Laps: 80

Stage Two
Laps: 80

Final Stage Results

Stage Three
Laps: 107

Race statistics
 Lead changes: 18 among 6 different drivers
 Cautions/Laps: 7 for 36
 Red flags: 0
 Time of race: 3 hours, 5 minutes and 21 seconds
 Average speed:

Media

Television
Fox Sports covered their 10th race at the Kansas Speedway. Mike Joy, three-time Kansas winner Jeff Gordon and Clint Bowyer called the race from the broadcast booth. Jamie Little and Regan Smith handled pit road for the television side. Larry McReynolds provided insight from the Fox Sports studio in Charlotte.

Radio
MRN had the radio call for the race which was also simulcast on Sirius XM NASCAR Radio. Alex Hayden and Jeff Striegle called the race in the booth when the field raced through the tri-oval. Dave Moody covered the race from the Sunoco spotters stand outside turn 2 when the field was racing through turns 1 and 2. Mike Bagley called the race from a platform outside turn 4. Steve Post and Pete Pistone worked pit road for the radio side.

Standings after the race

Drivers' Championship standings

Manufacturers' Championship standings

Note: Only the first 16 positions are included for the driver standings.
. – Driver has clinched a position in the NASCAR Cup Series playoffs.

References

2021 in sports in Kansas
2021 NASCAR Cup Series
Buschy McBusch Race 400
NASCAR races at Kansas Speedway